Nile Water (French: L'eau du Nil) is a 1928 French drama film directed by Marcel Vandal and starring Jean Murat, Max Maxudian and Lee Parry. Originally made as a silent film, it subsequently had a musical soundtrack added to it. It was the first French sound film, shot using a system owned by Gaumont. However, the system never took off and American and German technology came to dominate.

The film's sets were designed by the art director Fernand Delattre.

Main cast
 Jean Murat as Pierre Levannier 
 Max Maxudian as Wirsocq 
 Lee Parry as Anne Marie 
 René Lefèvre as Arthur de Sorgepoix 
 Gaston Jacquet as Basil Lescoe 
 Anita Labartha as Danseuse

References

Bibliography
 Crisp, C.G. The Classic French Cinema, 1930-1960. Indiana University Press, 1993.
 Kindem, Gorham Anders. The International Movie Industry. SIU Press, 2000.

External links

1928 films
1920s French-language films
Films directed by Marcel Vandal
French black-and-white films
1928 drama films
French drama films
Films set in Egypt
1920s French films